Jorge Alfonso Luque Ballon (born 4 May 1936) is a Colombian former cyclist. He competed in the individual and team road race events at the 1956 Summer Olympics.

Major results
1955
 1st  Road race, National Road Championships
1956
 2nd Overall Vuelta a Colombia
1st Stage 9
1957
 3rd Overall Vuelta a Colombia
1st  Mountains classification
1st Stages 4 & 5
1960
 1st  Overall Vuelta a Guatemala
1st Stage 4
1964
 1st Stage 14 Vuelta a Colombia

References

External links
 

1936 births
Living people
Colombian male cyclists
Olympic cyclists of Colombia
Cyclists at the 1956 Summer Olympics
Sportspeople from Bogotá
20th-century Colombian people